Vruir Yezekiel Galstian (March 3, 1924 — July 10, 1996) was an Armenian painter.

Biography 
Vruir Galstian was born  in 1924,  in Yerevan, Armenia. In 1958 he graduated from Panos Terlemezian Art College, Yerevan. From 1959 to 1964 he studied at Yerevan Fine Arts Institute. 
Since 1962 he participated in exhibitions both in Armenia, and abroad (Argentina, Portugal, France, Germany, the United States, as well as the countries of the former Soviet Union). He became a member of the Artists' Union of Armenia in 1968.

His paintings are displayed in the National Gallery of Armenia, the Modern Art Museum, Yerevan, the Tretyakov Gallery, Moscow, the Museum of Oriental Art, Moscow, and in many private collections. Vruir Galstian died in 1996 in Yerevan.

Books 
In 2006 was published book “Vruir” by art critic Henrik Igityan, and in 2008 another book by art critic Helen Gayfejyan.

References

External links 
 
 Vruyr Galstyan At Sotheby's
 Vruyr Galstyan At Sotheby's 2
 Modern Art Museum
 Arvest
 Abebooks
 National Gallery of Armenia

1924 births
1996 deaths
Soviet painters
Artists from Yerevan
Armenian portrait painters
20th-century Armenian painters